Priyanka Gill (born 2 June 1980) is an entrepreneur and angel investor currently based in London, UK. She is the founder and CEO of POPxo, a digital community platform for millennial women launched in 2014 and merged with MyGlamm in 2020. She currently serves as the co-founder of the Good Glamm Group. In 2019 Gill was named onto Businessworld 40 Under 40 List.

Early life and education 
Priyanka was born on 2 June 1980 and grew up in a small of Punjab, India. She completed her schooling from Vidya Devi Jindal School, Hisar and attended Lady Shri Ram College, New Delhi, where she studied English Literature. Priyanka is presently pursuing her EMBA from London Business School and Columbia Business School.

Career
In 2012, she started a fashion blog called eStylista. This went on to become a content platform by the same name (2013). A year later, the platform was renamed to POPxo.

In November 2014, Gill raised ₹3 crore for POPxo in pre-Series A funding, led by Rajan Anandan and Mithun Sacheti. The company raised an additional $2 million in Series A funding round from IDG Ventures, Kalaari Capital, and 500 startups.

In the year 2017 POPxo raised $3.1 million and $5.5 million in a round of funding led South Korea's Neoplux and Chinese mobile company OPPO with participation from existing investors.

In the same year, POPxo was named in the Unilever Foundry30 Southeast Asia and Australasia, a list of 30 most ambitious startups and scale-ups in the region.

In August 2020 POPxo merged with MyGlamm, a beauty and makeup products brand founded in 2017 and run by Sanghvi Beauty and Technologies Pvt Ltd. Gill later was designated as the co-founder of the joint entity.

As a journalist, she has contributed to several international publications, including The Independent and Travel + Leisure, and has written for Indian lifestyle magazine Hi! BLITZ.

Gill was a contributing editor for Harpers Bazaar India, guest blogger for Grazia, India editor and contributing fashion editor for UK-based Bond Magazine and Epicurean Life, and also writes for publications, such as The Guardian, Vogue India and Hello Pakistan.

Gill was invited for a panel discussion with Textile Minister Smriti Irani, Faye D’Souza, Sairee Chahal, Ananya Birla, and Flavia Agnes on Create, nurture and transform: the better half at the ETGBS 2019. She was also part of a discussion titled What Business Leaders Need to Know? organized by Businessworld on 24 October 2019. She also appeared on Hindustan Times’ show Brand Leadership hosted by HT Brand Studio.

In 2017 Gill started a social media influencer management company known as Plixxo, that connects influencers with brands to create content.

Gill invests in lifestyle brands and early-stage technology start-ups. She is an investor in Bea's of Bloomsbury, a chain of cake shops in London, Yeildify, Campanja, SoundOut, and Raptor Supplies.

Gill is a board member of TiE, a global non commercial organization focused on fostering entrepreneurship. She also serves as a board member for CXXO, an initiative by Kalaari Capital.

After the formation of Good Glamm Group in September 2021, Priyanka rose to the position of the Co-founder of Good Glamm Group.

She heads the Good Media Co. division of the company that comprises POPxo, ScoopWhoop, MissMalini and BabyChakra.

Art collector
Gill is a collector and investor in modern Indian art. In 2009, she bought Tyeb Mehta’s Mahisasura for US$1.2 million at a Christie's auction in New York. This work was sold at Christies inaugural Indian sale in Mumbai in December 2013 for US$3.2 million. Gill supports Indian art by hosting art soirees and receptions.

Personal life

Priyanka is married to Raj Gill, an independent trader based in London. The couple is ranked as number 33 in list of Asian Power Couples Hot 100 presented by Red Hot Curry.

Awards and recognition 

 2019: BW 40 Under 40, Businessworld
 2018: Young Woman Entrepreneur of the year at Conclave and Awards 2018
2018: Nominated for The Economic Times Startup Awards 2018
2020: 100 Technology Leaders, Impact

See also

 List of Indian journalists

References

External links
 Priyanka Gill
 

1980 births
Living people
Alumni of King's College London
Businesspeople from London